Petrus Shitembi (born 11 May 1992) is a Namibian left-footed football player who is currently the captain of the Namibia national football team.

Career
He progressed through all junior levels to the senior national team in a space of four years.

Shitembi played in a few matches in 2012, including the Brave Warriors 3–1 win during a German tour where he scored a two goals against SV Herbern. He played the whole game in the Brave Warriors loss to Morocco in a friendly on 12 January 2013.

Attacking midfielder Shitembi of Rundu Chiefs scored two goals before halftime to give Namibia a lead going at the break.

On 24 January 2013, he joined South African team University of Pretoria F.C. on a three-year deal.

On 1 February 2019, he joined Zambian giants Lusaka Dynamos Football Club. He left the club in the summer 2019 and among other things, he then went on a trial at German club SpVgg Greuther Fürth, scoring a goal in a friendly game in September 2019 against Würzburger Kickers.

International career

International goals
Scores and results list Namibia's goal tally first.

References

External links
Thevillager.com.na
Namibiasport.com.na
Petrus Shitembi at Footballdatabase

Living people
1992 births
Namibian men's footballers
Namibian expatriate footballers
Namibia international footballers
Association football midfielders
2019 Africa Cup of Nations players
Lusaka Dynamos F.C. players
University of Pretoria F.C. players
AmaZulu F.C. players
Ashanti Gold SC players
Stellenbosch F.C. players
Tura Magic F.C. players
Sabah F.C. (Malaysia) players
Namibia Premier League players
South African Premier Division players
National First Division players
Malaysia Super League players
Expatriate soccer players in South Africa
Expatriate footballers in Ghana
Expatriate footballers in Zambia
Expatriate footballers in Malaysia
Namibian expatriate sportspeople in South Africa
Namibian expatriate sportspeople in Ghana
Namibian expatriate sportspeople in Zambia
Namibian expatriate sportspeople in Malaysia
People from Kavango East
Namibia A' international footballers
2018 African Nations Championship players